Shlomo Dovrat is an Israeli high-tech entrepreneur and Co-Founder and General Partner at Viola Ventures, a top-tier Israeli venture capital firm, with over $4.5B under management. He spearheaded the recovery of ECI Telecom and in January 2005, sold Tecnomatix to the American software company UGS Corp. for about $227.7 million, making about $10 million from the deal. He is also known for heading the Israeli national commission for reform in education, known as the Dovrat Commission.

Career
Like many Israeli high tech entrepreneurs, Dovrat served in the Israel Defense Forces's Unit 8200  The first publicly traded company that Dovrat managed was Oshap, who went public on Wall Street in the mid-1980s. Dovrat managed Oshap business in Belgium, then at the age of 26 he became its CEO. In early 1999, SunGard bought Oshap for $220 million in a stock swap deal. Dovrat netted about $40 million from the sale.

Shlomo Dovrat founded Tecnomatix and served as its CEO and president from 1983 to 1995. He served as chairman until December 2001 and as a director until the company was eventually sold to UGS in 2005.

In 2000, Dovrat co-founded Viola Ventures.

Dovrat currently serves on the board of directors of a number of portfolio companies, including Outbrain,  ironSource, Optimal+, Worthy and Cellwize.

Dovrat has also served as chairman of ECI Telecom from 2002 until the sale of the company in 2007 for $1.25 billion.

Dovrat chaired the panel that handed out the first Israel Prize for Hi-Tech.

Dovrat Commission
The government-appointed Dovrat Commission, led by Dovrat, concluded in 2004, that the key to improving Israeli education is not more money but better-quality teaching. The recommendations included a reform giving school principals the right to fire bad teachers and reward good ones with higher pay. These moves have been blocked by Israel's teachers' unions, which have paralyzed schools with a series of long strikes, mostly blocking the proposed reforms.

Philanthropy
Dovrat has been actively involved in numerous philanthropic and public organizations and initiatives in the areas of social and economic development. He served as the chairman of the Israel Democracy Institute, founded Aaron Institute for Economic Policy and a co-founded Pnima – a cross community organization aspiring to create a cross tribal civic coalition.

See also
Viola Ventures

References

Israeli businesspeople
Living people
Education reform
Year of birth missing (living people)